Anton Karinger (1829-1870) was a Slovene painter and poet.

He was a pupil of Steinfeld in Vienna and is known for landscapes and seascapes, mostly views of Carinthia and the Adriatic coast.

His painting View of Mt. Triglav from Bohinj, along with other paintings of Triglav, became a symbol of the Carinthian Slovene people and is part of the core collection of the National Gallery of Slovenia.

References

1829 births
1870 deaths
Slovenian painters
Slovenian male painters